A fumblerule is a rule of language or linguistic style, humorously written in such a way that it breaks this rule.  Fumblerules are a form of self-reference.

The science editor George L. Trigg published a list of such rules in 1979. The term fumblerules was coined in a list of such rules compiled by William Safire on Sunday, 4 November 1979, in his column "On Language" in The New York Times. Safire later authored a book titled Fumblerules: A Lighthearted Guide to Grammar and Good Usage, which was reprinted in 2005 as How Not to Write: The Essential Misrules of Grammar.

Examples
 "Avoid clichés like the plague."
 "Don't listen to any advice."
 "Ending a sentence with a preposition is one thing that I will not put up with."
 "English is the crème de la crème of all languages."
 "Eschew obfuscation, espouse elucidation."
 "It is bad to carelessly split infinitives."
 "Never use no double negatives."
 "No sentence fragments."
 "Parentheses are (almost always) unnecessary."
 "The passive voice should never be employed."
 "You should not use a big word when a diminutive one would suffice."
 "And don't begin a sentence with a connective."
 "Using discourse markers in academic writing basically sounds terrible, you know."

See also

 Epimenides paradox, a self-referential statement by a Cretan that "All Cretans are liars."
 The Hacker Writing Style section of the Jargon File includes humorous examples of self-referential examples in copyediting, such as "This sentence no verb.", "Bad speling", and "Incorrectspa cing".

References

External links
The Fumblerules of Grammar by William Safire
Fumblerules entry on the alt.usage.english FAQ
Hacker writing style section of JARGON FILE, VERSION 4.3.3, 20 SEP 2002

Word games
Self-reference